The 1997 UIAA Climbing World Championships, the 4th edition, were held in Paris, France, from 31 January to 1 February 1997. It was organized by the Union Internationale des Associations d'Alpinisme (UIAA). The championships consisted of lead and speed events.

Medalists

Lead 
In men's lead, François Petit claimed the title. The 15-year-old Chris Sharma took silver, while the defending champion François Legrand took bronze.

In women's lead, Liv Sansoz took the win. Muriel Sarkany took second place, while Marietta Uhden took third.

Speed 
Daniel Andrada Jimenez and Tatiana Ruyga were the 1997 Speed World Champions.

References 

 IFSC Climbing World Championships
World Climbing Championships
International sports competitions hosted by France